The ridge scaled rattail or ridge-scaled grenadier, Macrourus carinatus, is a species of deep-water fish in the family Macrouridae.

Description and life history
The eyes are relatively large. The snout is short and moderately pointed. Coloration is medium brown to somewhat straw color, with darker, sometimes even blackish fins.

In the waters of the Falkland Islands, females reach 50% maturity at  pre-anal length and 14 years of age. Males reach 50% maturity at  pre-anal length and 12 years of age. Spawning occurs throughout the year but peaks during the austral autumn (April–July). Females also have a larger asymptotic pre-anal length than males, respectively. Maximum recorded age is 53 years.

Fisheries
Macrourus carinatus is a commercial fishery species. Targeted fishery along the Patagonian continental slope reached a peak of 50,000 tonnes in 1988 but declined precipitously thereafter. At present, it is treated as a by-catch species that is not allowed to exceed 10% of daily catches in weight.

References

 Tony Ayling & Geoffrey Cox, Collins Guide to the Sea Fishes of New Zealand,  (William Collins Publishers Ltd, Auckland, New Zealand 1982) 

Macrouridae
Fish of the Atlantic Ocean
Fish of the Indian Ocean
Fish of the Pacific Ocean
Fish of the Southern Ocean
Taxa named by Albert Günther
Fish described in 1878